The men's 1000 metres race of the 2014–15 ISU Speed Skating World Cup 7, arranged in the Gunda Niemann-Stirnemann-Halle in Erfurt, Germany, will be held on 21 March 2015.

Result
The race will take place on Saturday, 21 March, scheduled in the afternoon session, at 15:49.

References

Men 1000
7